Maple Leaf Stadium was a jewel box-style baseball stadium in Toronto, Ontario, Canada, located at the foot of Bathurst Street on the south side of Lake Shore Boulevard (formerly Fleet Street). It was built in 1926 by Lol Solman for his Toronto Maple Leafs baseball team of the International League. Previously, the Maple Leafs had played at Hanlan's Point Stadium. It continued to be the home of the Leafs for 42 seasons, until the team left town following the 1967 season. The stadium was demolished in 1968. Fans often referred to the stadium as the "Fleet Street Flats".

History

In 1925, the Maple Leafs acquired land at the foot of Bathurst Street on new land that had been in-filled from the lake by the Toronto Harbour Commission. Maple Leaf Stadium was designed by architects Chapman, Oxley and Bishop. Initial plans were for a 30,000 seat venue for baseball, football, and other sports. Construction was financed by the team and the Commission was to own the stadium. Construction was initially budgeted at $300,000 but was completed for $750,000.

The opening game was held on April 29, 1926, with the Maple Leafs rallying to defeat the Reading Keystones in extra innings before a rain-soaked crowd of 12,781. Toronto mayor Thomas Foster threw out the first pitch, caught by former mayor Thomas Church. Games were held only during the day until 1934 when lights for night games were installed.

In 1951, the Maple Leafs were sold to Jack Kent Cooke. Cooke spent $57,000 to refurbish the stadium. During the 1950s, attendance at games surged as Cooke promoted the games heavily on his radio station, CKEY, and the team gave away prizes to attendees. Twice, the team had better attendance than major-league teams.

On November 8, 1926, Maple Leaf Stadium was the site of the first professional American football game to be played outside the United States, a 28-0 victory for the New York Yankees over the Los Angeles Wildcats, both of the first American Football League. Estimated attendance for the game was 10,000. The Toronto Rifles of the Continental Football League played at the venue for their first season in 1965.

In the early 1960s, Cooke tried to persuade Toronto city council a new stadium was needed to attract a major league team, though the City of Toronto government was unwilling to shoulder the costs. Cooke, who had moved to the United States in 1960, sold the Maple Leafs in 1964. The Maple Leafs were sold again in 1967 and transferred to Louisville, Kentucky. By that time, the stadium was estimated to need $250,000 worth of repairs. The final home game, on September 4, 1967, drew a paid attendance of 802.

After the Maple Leafs left, the stadium was considered to be a safety hazard and demolition began within a few months into 1968. The site is currently occupied by apartment buildings. The adjacent Little Norway Park includes a ball field.

The site was part of the 1976 Toronto Olympic bid, which would have seen a domed stadium built and be part of a larger ‘Harbour City’ concept.  Toronto lost out as a candidate city to Montreal in 1968, canceling any plans for a stadium on the site.

International League Governors' Cup Finals at Maple Leaf Stadium

Junior World Series at Maple Leaf Stadium

Photo gallery

See also
 Exhibition Stadium
 Hanlan's Point Stadium
 Rogers Centre
 Sunlight Park

References

External links
Photos of Maple Leaf Stadium

Defunct baseball venues in Canada
Defunct sports venues in Toronto
Toronto Maple Leafs (International League)
Chapman and Oxley buildings
Sports venues completed in 1926
Sports venues demolished in 1968
Defunct minor league baseball venues
1926 establishments in Ontario
1967 disestablishments in Ontario
American football venues in Canada
Defunct sports venues in Canada
Demolished buildings and structures in Ontario
Demolished sports venues
Baseball venues in Ontario